Williams Deluxe Cabins is a historic motel complex located in West Whiteland Township, Chester County, Pennsylvania. It was built in 1937, and includes four contributing buildings. They are a service station and motel office, house, and two multiple rental units. The buildings have Tudor Revival design influences, such as half-timbering and rough faced stucco finish. The service station is a 1 1/2-story, "T"-shaped building with a steeply pitched cross gable roof.  It is linked to the office by a one-story breezeway.  The place is also referred to as Icabod's Plaza or Icabod's News.

It was listed on the National Register of Historic Places in 1988.

See also
 List of motels

References

Hotel buildings on the National Register of Historic Places in Pennsylvania
Tudor Revival architecture in Pennsylvania
Hotel buildings completed in 1937
Buildings and structures in Chester County, Pennsylvania
Motels in the United States
National Register of Historic Places in Chester County, Pennsylvania
1937 establishments in Pennsylvania